Franco Ferrari may refer to:

 Franco Ferrari (footballer, born 1987), Peruvian midfielder
 Franco Ferrari (footballer, born 1992), Argentine defender
 Franco Ferrari (footballer, born 1995), Argentine forward

See also
 Ferrari (surname)
 Franco (name) § Given name